The Fire Research Laboratory (FRL) is part of the Bureau of Alcohol, Tobacco, Firearms and Explosives (ATF), an investigative agency within the United States Department of Justice. Located in Beltsville, Maryland, the FRL is a partnership among law enforcement, fire services, public safety agencies, academia and the private sector that uses the most advanced scientific, technical, educational, and training methods in fire investigation science to serve and protect the public.

Functionality 
The Fire Research Laboratory does the following:

 Conducts scientific research that validates fire scene indicators and improves fire scene reconstruction and fire evidence analysis; 
 Supports fire and arson investigations and the resolution of fire related crimes;
 Develops improved investigative and prosecution procedures using scientifically validated methods that integrate the assets of the ATF and its partners to enhance fire investigation personnel expertise;
 Maintains a central repository for fire investigative research data that will be disseminated throughout the fire investigation community;
 Develops an internationally recognized research and education center for the advancement of knowledge, technology transfer and case support related to fire cause investigation and fire scene reconstruction.

See also
 Arson
 Fire investigation
 Fire protection engineering
 Fire science

References

External links 
 Fire Research Laboratory
 ATF Homepage
 Laboratory Fact Sheet

Bureau of Alcohol, Tobacco, Firearms and Explosives
Fire investigation